Vledderveen may refer to:

 Vledderveen, Drenthe
 Vledderveen, Groningen